Andreas Kristoffer Nordvik (born 18 March 1987) is a Norwegian footballer who plays as a centre-back for Byåsen Toppfotball. He is renowned for having equally good left and right foot ability, good speed and being a tough defensive player.

Career
Nordvik signed with Danish club FC Fredericia in February 2018, but left the club again, as he signed with Odd in August 2018. After the 2018 season Odds BK announced, that Nordvik alongside 2 other players, would leave the club.

On 7 June 2019, Nordvik joined Byåsen Toppfotball.

Honours

Club
Rosenborg BK
Tippeligaen: 2009

Vålerenga
Tippeligaen:
Runner-up (1): 2010

Career statistics

Notes

References

External links

1987 births
Living people
Norwegian footballers
FK Haugesund players
Rosenborg BK players
Vålerenga Fotball players
Aalesunds FK players
Sarpsborg 08 FF players
Esbjerg fB players
FC Fredericia players
Viking FK players
Odds BK players
Byåsen Toppfotball players
Eliteserien players
Norwegian First Division players
Norwegian Second Division players
Danish Superliga players
Danish 1st Division players
Norwegian people of Brazilian descent
Association football defenders
Norway youth international footballers
Norway under-21 international footballers
Footballers from Trondheim
Norwegian expatriate footballers
Expatriate men's footballers in Denmark
Norwegian expatriate sportspeople in Denmark